Ronick Chan Chun-ying (born 1961) is a Hong Kong banker. He was the board secretary and is now an advisor at Bank of China (Hong Kong) and the vice-chairman as well as Secretary General of the Chinese Banking Association of Hong Kong. In the 2016 Hong Kong Legislative Council election, he was elected uncontestedly in the Finance functional constituency for the Legislative Council of Hong Kong, representing the banking sector.

Biography
Chan was born and educated in Hong Kong. He received an MBA from Northeast Louisiana University in the United States. He started his career in a travel firm and entered banking in 1992, dealing with syndicated loans at Nanyang Commercial Bank before joining the Bank of China (Hong Kong). He went on to become the board secretary and company secretary of the BOC Hong Kong (Holdings) on 1 April 2011.

In 2016, Chan became the vice-chairman of the Chinese Banking Association of Hong Kong which was founded by 32 mainland banks with a presence in Hong Kong to spearhead banking policies and seek to create opportunities related to China’s 13th five-year plan and One Belt One Road objectives.

In the 2016 Hong Kong Legislative Council election, he was elected uncontestedly in the Finance functional constituency for the Legislative Council of Hong Kong, replacing outgoing Ng Leung-sing to represent the banking sector. He was backed by his employer, Bank of China (Hong Kong), HSBC, Standard Chartered Bank, Citibank and Bank of East Asia.

In December 2022, Chan said that fundraising requests could move through the Legislative Council more quickly due to all lawmakers being "patriots," with no more dissent and filibustering.

References

1961 births
Living people
Bank of China
Delegates to the 14th National People's Congress from Hong Kong
HK LegCo Members 2016–2021
HK LegCo Members 2022–2025
Hong Kong bankers
University of Louisiana at Monroe alumni